Ede Reményi or Eduard Reményi (January 17, 1828 Miskolc, Austria-Hungary May 15, 1898 San Francisco) was a Hungarian violinist and composer. His birth date is disputed, and variously given from 1828-1830.

Biography
Reményi was born in Miskolc, Hungary, as Eduard Hoffmann. He studied under Joseph Böhm at the Vienna Conservatory from 1842 to 1845. Banished from Austria for participation in the Hungarian Revolution of 1848, he went to Germany, where he befriended the 15-year-old Johannes Brahms and introduced him to Hungarian music. Pursued by German authorities, he fled to the United States in December, 1849. He returned to Europe in 1852, toured with Brahms in 1853, and then sojourned for a time at Weimar, where he received the benefit of Franz Liszt's instruction and friendship. In 1854 he became solo violinist to Britain's Queen Victoria. He obtained his amnesty in 1860 and returned to Hungary, being soon afterward appointed soloist to Emperor Franz Joseph. He then retired for some years.

While born Eduard Hoffmann, he started using the name Ede Reményi by the time of the Revolutions of 1848, and his entire family followed suit sometime by 1862.

In 1865 he made a brilliant tour through France, Germany, Belgium, and Holland. From 1871 to 1877 he was in Paris, whence two years later he proceeded to London and then to the United States (where he took up residence), Canada, and Mexico. A concert tour round the world was undertaken by him in 1886, in the course of which he visited Japan, China, Cochinchina, and the Cape of Good Hope.

He died during a concert he was giving in San Francisco in 1898, aged 70.

Among his original compositions is a Violin Concerto.

Gallery

Bibliography 
 
 Gwendolyn Dunlevy Kelley and George P. Upton, Edouard Remenyi Musician, Litterateur and Man, A. C. Mclurg, 1906

References

External links
 
 
 Robert W. Eshbach: "Reményi Before Brahms" http://josephjoachim.com/2014/09/29/remenyi-before-brahms/

1828 births
1898 deaths
19th-century composers
19th-century Hungarian people
19th-century classical violinists
Male classical violinists
Austro-Hungarian people
Hungarian classical violinists
Hungarian exiles
Hungarian expatriates in the United States
Hungarian Jews
Jewish classical composers
Jewish violinists
People from Miskolc
Musicians who died on stage
19th-century classical composers
Hungarian male classical composers
Hungarian classical composers
19th-century male musicians